Cowal is a peninsula, a geographical region in the south of Argyll and Bute, within the Scottish Highlands.

Cowal may also refer to:

Places

Australia

Lake Cowal, largest inland lake in New South Wales.

Indonesia

Cowal, Indonesia, a village located in West Java.

Ships

MV Cowal, a hoist-loading vehicle ferry operated by the Caledonian Steam Packet Company

Other uses

 
 Cowal Community Hospital, the hospital serving the Cowal Peninsula
 Cowal Highland Gathering, held in Dunoon, Cowal
 Loch Lomond and Cowal Way, long distance waymarked way, between Portavadie and Inveruglas, Cowal
 Glasgow Cowal, a defunct shinty club, founded in 1876
 Cowal and Bute (shinty), women's shinty club based in Dunoon